Fidèle was a 32-gun  of the French Navy.

Service history
In 1791, Fidèle took part in Girardin's Expedition to Martinique, under Captain François Étienne de Rosily-Mesros. In November, she served as a troopship and in Brest harbour. Fidèle took part in the Croisière du Grand Hiver and in the Battle of Groix, under Lieutenant Bernard.

In 1802, Fidèle was condemned, and used as a hulk and barracks in Brest until 1816. The vessel was then scrapped.

Sources and references
 

Age of Sail frigates of France
Félicité-class frigates
Ships built in France
1789 ships